"Give a Little Love" is a song written by Paul Kennerley and recorded by American country music duo The Judds. It was released in June 1988 as the first single from their Greatest Hits compilation album.  The song reached number 2 on the Billboard Hot Country Singles chart.

Chart performance
"Give a Little Love" debuted on the U.S. Billboard Hot Country Singles & Tracks chart the week of June 11, 1988.

Weekly charts

Year-end charts

References

1988 singles
1988 songs
The Judds songs
Songs written by Paul Kennerley
RCA Records singles
Curb Records singles
Song recordings produced by Brent Maher